The Centurians were an instrumental surf rock band started by Dennis Rose from Newport Beach, California. They were active in the late 1950s and early 1960s. Their music has been used in at least two films. They reformed as The Centurions in 1995 and released new material.

Background
The group originated from Costa Mesa, California, they were a septet.

In recent times, they are best known for their recording "Bullwinkle Part II", a dark and saxy surf tune from their album Surfers' Pajama Party. This tune is featured in the 1994 film Pulp Fiction. The song was used to highlight a scene.  It was also used in an episode of the TV show How I Met Your Mother entitled "Girls Versus Suits". Less well known is their cover of the classic song "Intoxica" a twangy and upbeat surf instrumental originally by The Revels, used in the 1972 film Pink Flamingos.

Career

1960s
In 1963, their line-up consisted of Pat Gagnebin, Ken Robinson, Dennis Rose, Joe Dominic, Dennis Kiklas, Ernie Furrow, and Jeff Lear.<ref>Surfin' Guitars: Instrumental Surf Bands of the Sixties, Robert J. Dalley – Page 50</ref> When they released their album on Del-Fi records in 1963, its cover was identical (as well as catalog number) to Bruce Johnston's release, hence the title "Surfers' Pajama Party" – which was not the name The Centurians had in mind.  Their name was changed from The Centurions to The Centurians sometime after 1967 due to legal reasons.

In 1966, some of the music they recorded, along with music by Dave Meyers and the Surf Tones and The Sentinels was involved in legal action by Al Schlesinger against the Del-Fi Records label. Schlesinger was representing Anthony Music and its principal shareholder Anthony Hilder in an action pursuing $122,000 over royalties not being paid as per an alleged agreement for the masters of albums and another album, Battle of the Surf Bands.

Later years
In June 1995 Dennis Rose reformed the group as "The Centurions" with Dennis Rose (guitar), David Jobes (drums), Charly Grey-Son (bass), Perris Alexander (keyboards), Norman Knowles (tenor sax) and Dennis Rehders (tenor and baritone sax). They recorded a new album called Bullwinkle Part III produced by Dennis Rose and Perris Alexander.  In August 1995 the group performed a concert at Pierfest''  in Huntington Beach.

Original members

Legacy
The song "Bullwinkle Part II" was used in the 1994 film Pulp Fiction and features on the soundtrack album. The film's success led to the band's reunion. In 1999 "Bullwinkle Part II" was  covered by Elliot Easton's Tiki Gods on the Del-Fi tribute compilation "Delfonic Sounds Today!".

Discography

References

External links
 
 Myspace: The Centurions
 

Surf music groups
Sextets
Septets
Musical groups from Orange County, California
Del-Fi Records artists